Aloke Mukherjee is an Indian former international football left back. He was active as a footballer from 1978 to 1997. He was named in the All Time best Eleven Indian Team by footballer and coach PK. Banerjee. He is currently working as Deputy General Manager & Joint Director–Food (Gazetted Officer) in Food Corporation of India.

Early life 
Aloke Mukherjee was born to Jiban Krishna Mukherjee and Renuka Mukherjee in Ichapur, North 24 Parganas of West Bengal, and is a graduate from Anandamath College of the University of Calcutta. During his school days, he participated in inter-school tournaments and in different districts of West Bengal.

Career 

Mukherjee was cptain of the India national team during the 1980s. He represented India in various international tournaments from 1981-88.

International tournaments
 Kings Cup ( Bangkok ) – 1981
 Asian Games – 1982, 1986
 Presidents Cup ( Seoul ) – 1982
 Nehru Cup – 1982, 83, 84, 85
 Pre Olympics – 1983
 Merdeka Cup – 1982, 86
 Great Wall Cup – 1984
 Pre world Cup – 1985
 SAF Games – 1985, 87 (gold medal winner)

Bengal
Santosh Trophy – 1981 (winner), 82 (winner), 83, 84, 85, 86 (winner), 87, 88 (winner-captain), 93

Clubs

 Eastern Railways – 1978-79, was the paramount member of 78,79 Santosh Trophy for Railways.
 George Telegraph – 1980
Mohammedan Sporting – 1981

Trophies won
Calcutta Football League(3) – 1982, 85, 91
 Durand Cup(2) – 1982, 91
 IFA Shield (3) – 1983, 84, 91
 Federation Cup (1) – 1985
 DCM Trophy (1) – 1983
 Darjeeling Gold cup (2) – 1982, 85
 Negjee Trophy (1) – 1983
 Mohunbagan Club – 1986-90, 92-94
Calcutta Football League(4) – 1986, 90, 92, 94
 Durand Cup (2) – 1986, 94
 IFA Shield (1) – 1987, 89
 Federation Cup (4) – 1986, 87, 92, 94
 Rovers Cup (2) – 1988, 92
 Sikkim Gold Cup (4) – 1986, 89, 92, 94
 All Airlines Gold Cup (1) – 1989
 JC Guha Memorial Trophy (1) – 1988
 Food Corporation of India – 1995, 96, 97

Managerial career
Mukherjee was head coach of Bengal–Mohunbagan (2003), East Bengal (2008) and Mohammedan sporting club (2012-13). Under his coaching Mohunbagan club won the IFA Shield in 2003, defeating arch-rivals East Bengal club. As assistant coach of senior India, he participated in the Asian Games, LG Cup(winner in 2003), Afro Asian Games, Pre-World Cup, and SAF Games. He was chief coach of India in 2003 SAF Games held at Islamabad, where India were runners-up and recipients of the silver medal. Mukherjee was two times coach of Senior Bengal in the Santosh Trophy. Under his coaching Bengal U-21 team became a champion in Balia, Uttar Pradesh.

He has also managed then NFL side Tollygunge Agragami FC from 2001 to 2002.

He also managed Mohammadan Sporting.

Awards
 Best Footballer of the year – 1981, 94
 Banglar Gaurav 2013 – State Government Award
 Mother Teresa International Award

References

External links
 http://www.thehindu.com/todays-paper/tp-features/tp-metroplus/simply-the-best/article3185848.ec 
 http://www.rediff.com/sports/2003/may/16bagan.htm 
 https://web.archive.org/web/20150211133057/http://eastbengalfootballclub.com/hall-of-fame.php Hall of Fame – Kingfisher East Bengal
 https://www.sportskeeda.com/football/indian-football-team-at-the-asian-games-1982-new-delhi 
 https://www.sportskeeda.com/football/greatest-indian-football-xi-of-all-time 

1960 births
Living people
People from North 24 Parganas district
Footballers from West Bengal
Indian footballers
India international footballers
Indian football coaches
Indian football managers
Mohun Bagan AC players
Mohammedan SC (Kolkata) players
East Bengal Club players
Mohammedan SC (Kolkata) managers
Tollygunge Agragami FC managers
Association football defenders
Footballers at the 1982 Asian Games
Footballers at the 1986 Asian Games
Asian Games competitors for India
South Asian Games medalists in football
South Asian Games gold medalists for India